Geniostoma gagneae is a species of plant in the Loganiaceae family. It is endemic to French Polynesia.

References

Flora of French Polynesia
gagneae
Data deficient plants
Taxonomy articles created by Polbot